Mentez is a Latin American-focused social network game publisher based in Miami.

Mentez is significant because the company is the leading social game publisher in Latin America, a rapidly growing social network and gaming area of the world. Paymentez processes more than  45,000 transactions a day.

As of August 2010, the company had 21 games on Orkut and 7 games on Facebook, with more than  22 million weekly active players.

Mentez signed a distribution agreement with Zynga in 2011  be a distributor of Zynga Game Cards and PINS at more than 1 million retail locations and Internet cafes across. 

Mentez signed a distribution agreement with Disney-owned Playdom in 2010 to publish several games in Latin America. These include Tiki Resort and Bola. 

Mentez operates an alternative payments network in Brazil called Paymentez. As of August 2010, users could buy Paymentez credits at 25,000 internet cafes or 100,000 retail locations across Brazil. 

Mentez received an undisclosed amount of funding in 2010 from Insight Venture Partners.

Juan F Franco is currently Mentez CEO, Jaime Roldan is Mentez CTO and Juan Roldan is Mentez VP Content.

References

External links
 Mentez official site
 Paymentez official site

Video game companies of the United States
Video game publishers